Fred Eloy Manrique Reyes [man-RE-kay] (born November 5, 1961) is a former Major League Baseball second baseman who played for the Toronto Blue Jays (1981, 1984), Montreal Expos (1985), St. Louis Cardinals (1986), Chicago White Sox (1987–89), Texas Rangers (1989), Minnesota Twins (1990) and Oakland Athletics (1991). He batted and threw right-handed.

A native of Bolívar State, Venezuela, and the youngest of 10 children, the well-traveled Manrique was a solid second baseman with a good range and a strong throwing arm that allowed him to play deep and steal hits. He also was an above-average shortstop. When he debuted in the Major Leagues in 1981 as a 19-year-old, he was the youngest player in the Major Leagues.

In a nine-year career, Manrique was a .254 hitter with 20 home runs and 151 RBI in 498 games.

See also
 List of Major League Baseball players from Venezuela

References

External links

Venezuelan Professional Baseball League statistics

1961 births
Cardenales de Lara players
Caribes de Oriente players
Chicago White Sox players
Dunedin Blue Jays players
Indianapolis Indians players
Kinston Eagles players
Knoxville Blue Jays players
Living people
Louisville Redbirds players
Major League Baseball players from Venezuela
Major League Baseball second basemen
Medicine Hat Blue Jays players
Minnesota Twins players
Montreal Expos players
Oakland Athletics players
People from Ciudad Bolívar
Portland Beavers players
St. Louis Cardinals players
Syracuse Chiefs players
Tacoma Tigers players
Texas Rangers players
Tigres de Aragua players
Toronto Blue Jays players
Venezuelan expatriate baseball players in Canada
Venezuelan expatriate baseball players in the United States